Wojciech Kowalewski (born 11 May 1977), is a retired Polish football goalkeeper.

Club career
Kowalewski made his top-flight debut with Wigry Suwałki during the 1996–97 season, but it was not until 2001–02, after a loan spell with second division side Dyskobolia Grodzisk, that he finally established himself with Legia. Midway through the season he moved to FC Shakhtar Donetsk and only conceded once in nine league games as Shakhtar stormed to the Ukrainian title for the first time. 

After initially moving to Spartak Moscow on loan in June 2003, Kowalewski signed a five-year contract with Spartak on 7 November 2003. In late 2007, having lost his place to Stipe Pletikosa, he requested to leave the club. In December 2007 Spartak agreed to terminate his contract. He had not played for Spartak in over a year.

On 17 January 2008 it was announced that Kowalewski had started a trial period with Premier League club Reading. On 3 February 2008, Kowalewski signed a three-year deal with Polish club Korona Kielce.

Kowalewski has a reputation of being an excellent penalty-saver, once breaking FC Torpedo Moskva's Vladimir Leonchenko's streak of 13 successful spot-kicks. On 17 January 2010 Iraklis Thessaloniki F.C. released experienced Polish goalkeeper. The player was tracked by Legia Warsaw, but joined the Russian Premier League newcomers Sibir Novosibirsk instead.

International career
Kowalewski made his Poland debut in February 2002, but made only a handful of appearances before being recalled to the side at the start of Euro 2008 qualifying. He was replaced by Artur Boruc after picking up a second yellow against Portugal on 11 October 2006. Poland won that game 2–1.

Kowalewski replaced Tomasz Kuszczak in Poland's Euro 2008 squad following the Manchester United goalkeeper's back injury.

In September 2009 he was recalled to the squad for the World Cup Qualifiers against the Czech Republic and Slovakia by coach Stefan Majewski. He was the starter against the Czechs as Poland slipped to a 2–0 defeat on 10 October 2009 which killed off any lingering hopes of qualifying for the tournament finals.

International

Trivia
During Euro 2008, Kowalewski had to re-use the UEFA ID card of his team-mate Mariusz Lewandowski to enter the stadium in Klagenfurt for the match against Germany as he did not obtain an accreditation pass due to an oversight by the Polish delegation.

References

External links
 
 National team stats on the website of the Polish Football Association 

1977 births
Living people
Polish footballers
Sportspeople from Białystok
Legia Warsaw players
Dyskobolia Grodzisk Wielkopolski players
FC Shakhtar Donetsk players
FC Spartak Moscow players
Iraklis Thessaloniki F.C. players
FC Sibir Novosibirsk players
Arka Gdynia players
Anorthosis Famagusta F.C. players
Wigry Suwałki players
Poland international footballers
Association football goalkeepers
UEFA Euro 2008 players
Polish expatriate footballers
Russian Premier League players
Ekstraklasa players
Super League Greece players
Ukrainian Premier League players
Cypriot First Division players
Expatriate footballers in Ukraine
Expatriate footballers in Cyprus
Expatriate footballers in Russia
Expatriate footballers in Greece
Polish expatriate sportspeople in Ukraine
Polish expatriate sportspeople in Cyprus
Polish expatriate sportspeople in Russia
Polish expatriate sportspeople in Greece